Subglacial means "formed, or occurring beneath a glacier or other body of ice". It may refer to:

 Subglacial eruption
 Subglacial lake
 Subglacial stream
 Subglacial volcano

Glaciology